"In Cold Blood" is a song by British indie rock band alt-J. It is the second track and second single from their third studio album, Relaxer, and was released as a digital single on 29 March 2017 by Infectious Music and Atlantic Records. The song was written by Joe Newman, Gus Unger-Hamilton, and Thom Sonny Green and produced by Charlie Andrew. It features a brass section recorded at Abbey Road Studios in London and a Casiotone the band purchased for £1.05 on eBay. The song's title is a reference to the novel of the same name by American novelist Truman Capote. The song's composition dates back to when the band started during their studies at the University of Leeds.

Composition and lyrics
In an interview with NPR, the band said: 
The song starts with the eight digit binary phrase: "zero one one one zero zero one one" (01110011), which is 163 (octal), 115 (decimal), and 73 (hex), which translates to a lowercase "s" under the ASCII system. It is unclear what this means, although the band labeled a teaser for the song "3WW" with the binary ASCII encoding “00110011 01110111 01110111”. If extended to use all of the numbers in the line we get the number 01110011(cry)0 (and I'm Hearing) 111 which is 1847 - the year that Samuel Colt sold his patented revolvers to the Texas rangers in the war against Mexico.

Music video
The music video for the song was released on 9 May 2017. It was directed by Casper Balslev, who had previously directed videos for Marina and the Diamonds and MØ. The video is narrated by Iggy Pop, frontman of The Stooges.

Performances
On 18 April 2017, alt-J performed "In Cold Blood" on the 656th episode of The Tonight Show Starring Jimmy Fallon. The band performed the song with a backing horn section and with Questlove, the drummer of Jimmy Fallon's house band The Roots. On 19 May 2017, alt-J performed "In Cold Blood" on the sixth episode of the fiftieth series of Later... with Jools Holland. On 5 June 2017, alt-J performed "In Cold Blood" on Conan.

The band also performed "In Cold Blood" for their second NPR tiny desk concert in an acoustic, string accompanied medley.

In Cold Blood is also the ending theme for the Netflix anime series Ingress.

Critical reception
"In Cold Blood" received favorable reviews from contemporary music critics. Robin Murray of Clash called it "both straight-forwardly melodic and fascinatingly complex, the interweaving vocals underpinned by bleeping electronics and flashes of brass."

Track listing

Personnel
Credits adapted from Tidal

alt-J
Joe Newman – guitar, vocals, bass guitar
Gus Unger-Hamilton – keyboards, vocals
Thom Sonny Green – drums, percussion

Additional musicians
Joe Auckland – trumpet
Martin Williams – tenor saxophone
Trevor Mires – trombone
Mike Kearsey – trombone
Adrien Hallowel – trombone

Technical
Charlie Andrew – production, mixing, programming
Brett Cox – engineering
Jay Pocknell - engineering
Stefano Civetta – assistant engineering
Paul Pritchard – assistant engineering
Graeme Baldwin – assistant engineering
Dick Beetham – mastering

Artwork and design
Osamu Sato

Charts

Weekly charts

Year-end charts

Certifications

References

External links
 

2017 singles
Alt-J songs
2017 songs
Infectious Music singles
Atlantic Records singles
Songs written by Thom Sonny Green